Bhamo Airport  is an airport serving Bhamo (Banmaw), a city in the Kachin State in northern Myanmar. It is also known as Banmaw Airport.

History
Built as a Japanese Air Force base in 1942, the airport was attacked numerous times by Allied forces before being seized in May 1945.  It was repaired by the 1891st Engineer Aviation Battalion then was used as a combat resupply and casualty evacuation airfield by Tenth Air Force, which moved elements of the 1st Combat Cargo Group to the field.  It was also used as a communications relay station as well as a base for forward air controllers (51st Fighter Control Squadron).  It was closed at the end of September 1945.

Facilities

Airlines and destinations

References

External links
 

Airports in Myanmar
Kachin State
Airfields of the United States Army Air Forces in Myanmar
Airfields of the United States Army Air Forces Air Transport Command in the China-Burma-India Theater
Airports established in 1942
1942 establishments in Burma